The 1995 World Group II Play-offs were four ties which involved the losing nations of the World Group II and four nations from the three Zonal Group I competitions. Nations that won their play-off ties entered the 1996 World Group II, while losing nations joined their respective zonal groups.

Belgium vs. South Korea

Czech Republic vs. Sweden

Italy vs. Indonesia

Paraguay vs. Slovakia

References

See also
Fed Cup structure

World Group II Play-offs